Det Gyldne Bur (The Golden Cage) is an award given to the best goalkeeper in Danish football each year. The winner is found by votes among the goalkeepers in the two top divisions of Danish football; the Danish Superliga and Danish 1st Division. The award has been handed out by Danish sports paper TIPS-Bladet since 1984.

Recipients

External links 
 26 års vindere af Det Gyldne Bur at TIPS-Bladet

Association football trophies and awards